William Redman (29 January 1928 - December 1994) was an English footballer. His regular position was as a full back.

Redman started his professional career with Manchester United in 1946. He made his United debut on 7 October 1950 in a Football League match against Sheffield Wednesday. In 1952, he helped United win the 1951-52 league title. In 1954, he was transferred to Bury, where he spent two seasons, before moving on to Buxton.

1928 births
1994 deaths
English footballers
Manchester United F.C. players
Bury F.C. players
Footballers from Manchester
Association football defenders